The year 2020 was the sixth year in the history of the Rizin Fighting Federation, a mixed martial arts promotion based in Japan. The season started with Rizin Fighting Federation in Hamamatsu. It started broadcasting through a television agreement with  Fuji Television. In North America and Europe Rizin FF is available on PPV all over the world and on FITE TV.

List of events

Rizin 21 – Hamamatsu

Rizin 21 – Hamamatsu was a Combat sport event held by the Rizin Fighting Federation on February 22, 2020 at the Hamamatsu Arena in Hamamatsu, Japan.

Results

Rizin 22 – Starting Over

Rizin 22 – Starting Over was a Combat sport event held by Rizin Fighting Federation on August 9, 2020 at the Pia Arena MM in Yokohama, Japan.

Background
The event was initially planned to be held on April 19, 2020 at the Yokohama Arena in Yokohama, Japan However, the event was cancelled on April 2, 2020, due to the prevailing COVID-19 pandemic.

Results

Rizin 23 – Calling Over

Rizin 23 – Calling Over was a Combat sport event held by Rizin Fighting Federation on August 10, 2020 at the Pia Arena MM in Yokohama, Japan.

Background
A Rizin Bantamweight Championship bout for the vacant title between former title challenger Kai Asakura and Hiromasa Ougikubo served as the event headliner. Former Rizin Bantamweight champion Manel Kape announced on March 30, 2020 that he would be relinquishing the bantamweight title and announce he has signed a multi-fight deal with the UFC.

Results

Rizin 24 – Saitama

Rizin  24 – Saitama was a Combat sport event held by Rizin Fighting Federation on September 27, 2020 at the Saitama Super Arena in Saitama, Japan.

Background
The first two fights announced for Rizin 24 was a bantamweight bout between Kai Asakura and Shoji Maruyama, as well as a women's strawweight bout between Rena Kubota and Emi Tomimatsu. A fight between two MMA veterans was announced as well, as Takasuke Kume took on Satoru Kitaoka. The main event was a kickboxing fight between Tenshin Nasukawa and Koji.

Results

Rizin 25 – Osaka

Rizin  25 – Osaka was a Combat sport event held by Rizin Fighting Federation on November 21, 2020 at the Osaka-jō Hall in Osaka, Japan.

Background
During the press conference prior to Rizin 25, Rizin CEO Nobuyuki Sakakibara confirmed that nine fights were finalized for the card.

Rizin standout Mikuru Asakura will fight the former Shooto Lightweight champion Yutaka Saito for the inaugural featherweight title. Former Bantamweight title challenger Hiromasa Ougikubo is scheduled to fight Kenta Takizawa. Former strawweight King of Pancrase Daichi Kitakata is scheduled to face the ZST Flyweight champion Tatsuki Saomoto.

Two additional MMA bouts were announced: Yojiro Uchimura vs. Kyohei Hagiwara in the featherweight division and Ryuichiro Sumimura vs. Gota Yamashita in the welterweight division. The remaining four fights are kickboxing bouts: Taiga Kawabe will fight Yuma Yamahata, Yuma Yamaguchi is scheduled to fight Shohei Asahara, Hidenori Ebata will take on Isami Sano and Jin Mandokoro is set to go up against Syuto Sato. A fight between Kotetsu Boku and Rikuto Shirakawa was later added to the card.

Results

Rizin 26 – Saitama

Rizin  26 – Saitama was a combat sport event held by Rizin Fighting Federation on December 31, 2020 at the Saitama Super Arena in Saitama, Japan.

Background
The card was headlined by a rematch for the Rizin bantamweight championship, in his first title defense the reigning bantamweight champion Kai Asakura has met the former champion Kyoji Horiguchi. The two met previously in a non-title bout, with Asakura winning by knockout.

Olympic silver medalist Shinobu Ota, has signed with Rizin Fighting Championship, he made his MMA debut against the veteran Hideo Tokoro.

Former RIZIN Super Atomweight champion Ayaka Hamasaki was set to fight Miyuu Yamamoto for the vacant Super Atomweight title.

Tenshin Nasukawa was scheduled to fight Kumandoi Phetjaroenvit, while Takanori Gomi was scheduled to fight Koji under special standup rules. Gomi's weight limit was 75 kg and Koji's 65 kg. The rules of the bout forbid grappling and kicking, while both fighters wore 12oz gloves.

Sakura Mori missed weight for her atomweight bout with Eru Takebayashi by 1.7 kg.

Results

See also
 2020 in UFC 
 Bellator MMA in 2020
 2020 in ONE Championship 
 2020 in Konfrontacja Sztuk Walki
 2020 in Absolute Championship Akhmat
 2020 in Road FC

References

External links
 Official event
 

Rizin Fighting Federation
2020 in mixed martial arts
2020 in Japanese sport
2020 sport-related lists